Sophie Hardy is a French actress.

Filmography

References

External links

1944 births
French film actresses
Living people
Actresses from Paris
20th-century French actresses